Just a Singer is the fourth album by Lobo, released in 1974 on Big Tree Records. The album, along with A Cowboy Afraid of Horses, was reissued in 1997 by Rhino Records as a single issue. It contains covers of various hit songs.

The album peaked at No. 183 on the US Top LPs chart. Its only single "Rings" narrowly missed the Top 40 on the Billboard Hot 100, peaking at No. 43, but it was a top 10 hit on the Easy Listening chart, peaking at No. 8.

Track listing

Personnel
Lobo - guitar, lead vocals
Emory Gordy Jr. - bass
Dennis St. John - drums
Richard Bennett - guitar
Alan Lindgren - keyboards

Production
Producer: Phil Gernhard
Engineer: Michael Lietz

Charts
Album

'''Singles

References

External links

1974 albums
Big Tree Records albums
Lobo (musician) albums